Esperin (also Romanized as Esperīn, Esprīn, and Asperin; also known as Esfrīn, Isbarin, and Isbirin) is a village in Sojas Rud Rural District, Sojas Rud District, Khodabandeh County, Zanjan Province, Iran. At the 2006 census, its population was 258, in 52 families.

References 

Populated places in Khodabandeh County